There were three main police forces of Nazi Germany under the  Reichsführer-SS, Heinrich Himmler from 1936: 

 (Orpo; order police) consisting of the regular uniformed police
 (SD; security service)

Leadership and control
The leadership of the German police was formally vested in the Minister of the Interior, Wilhelm Frick from January 1933, who along with Hermann Göring exercised executive power over Germany's police organs; this was an important part of Adolf Hitler's effort to increase his administrative grip over the nation. 

On 17 June 1936, Hitler appointed Himmler chief of the German police, which resulted in a "unified concentration of the entire police apparatus...and the administrative concentration of the police forces of the entire Reich." This action effectively merged the police into the SS and removed it from Frick's control. As Germany's most senior policeman, Himmler had two goals; first the official goal of centralization and : reforming the German police forces after Nazi Party ideals; secondly, the unofficial goal of making the German police an adjunct of the SS, thereby increasing his power base and improving his standing among Hitler's vassals. 

By August 1936, the Gestapo was standardized across the Reich, wherein all political police—of which there were seventeen different organs—were merged.

References

Citations

Bibliography

  
 

 

Police of Nazi Germany
Law in Nazi Germany
Nazi SS